There are ten National Natural Landmarks in the U.S. state of Georgia.  

National Natural Landmarks
Georgia